IIUC may refer to:

 International Islamic University, Chittagong
 IIUC - Internet slang abbreviation for "if I understand correctly"